A cub is the young of certain large predatory animals such as big cats or bears; analogous to a domestic puppy or kitten.

Cub or CUB may also refer to:

Arts and entertainment 
 The Cub, a 1915 American silent film
 Cub (film), a 2014 film
 C.U. Burn, an Irish-language television series
 Cub (Happy Tree Friends), a character in the Happy Tree Friends animated video series
 Cub Records, a record label
 Cub (band), a former band from Vancouver, Canada

Aircraft and aviation 
 Cub Aircraft, a former Canadian aircraft manufacturer
 Antonov An-12, a Russian transport aircraft (NATO reporting name: Cub)
 Napier Cub, an experimental British aircraft engine
 Piper J-3 Cub, an American light aircraft
 Taylor Cub, a precursor aircraft to the Piper Cub
 Zlin Savage Cub, a Czech light aircraft
 Cubana de Aviación (ICAO airline designator: CUB), Cuban national airline
 Jim Hamilton–L.B. Owens Airport (IATA airport code and FAA location identifier both CUB), serving Columbia, South Carolina, United States

Motor vehicles 
 Auto Cub, an American single-passenger automobile
 Bajaj Cub, an Indian motor scooter
 Farmall Cub, an American tractor
 Honda Super Cub, a range of motorcycles
 LDV Cub, a British van
 Leyland Cub, a British bus
 Andersen Mini-Cub, a version of the Mini Moke
 Kapcai, a class of motorcycle of Southeast Asia; see Malaysian Cub Prix

People 
 Cub (nickname), a list of people
 Cub Scout, a member of a Cub Scout organization
 a young member of the Bear (gay culture) community

Other uses 
 Cub City, West Virginia, United States
 Cub Foods, an American supermarket chain
 Carlton & United Breweries, an Australian brewing company
 Cashed Up Bogan, a slang term used in Australia and New Zealand 
 Cuba, IOC country code: CUB
 Cursor Back (ANSI), an ANSI X3.64 escape sequence
 University of Colorado at Boulder (CU Boulder)
 University City of Bogotá
 Urban Community of Bordeaux''

See also
 Cubs (disambiguation)
 Kub (disambiguation)